Prairie View station is on Metra's North Central Service in the unincorporated area of Prairie View, Illinois, near Buffalo Grove. In Metra's zone-based fare system, Prairie View is in zone G. As of 2018, Prairie View is the 113th busiest of Metra's 236 non-downtown stations, with an average of 415 weekday boardings.

As of December 12, 2022, Prairie View is served by all 14 trains (seven in each direction) on weekdays.

References

External links 

Station House from Google Maps Street View

Metra stations in Illinois
Railway stations in Lake County, Illinois
Railway stations in the United States opened in 1996
1996 establishments in Illinois
Former Soo Line stations